F. hepatica may refer to:

Fasciola hepatica, a flatworm species
Fistulina hepatica, a fungus species